György Szondy was a Hungarian soldier and the captain of Drégely Castle. He was a respected soldier, even by his Turkish foes, whose recognition can be seen by his burial by Hadim Ali Pasha with full military honours.

Family
Szondy's origin is obscure. Hontvármegye, and he either came from a peasant or a civic family. According to other sources, he was a yeoman of Turóc County with original name Juraj Šucha. After the sudden death of his mother he joined the army at the age of 15 with his younger brother Jakab where he met Ferenc Révay, a general officer from a prominent Hungarian noble family.

Révay saw great potential in Szondy and took him under his wing. Révay made Szondy into a lieutenant of the Hungarian Hussars at the age of 21. After taking part in campaigns against the Ottoman Turks in Serbia and Transylvania, where he and his brother both served, Szondy decided that he should spend the rest of his service as an infantryman. Szondy became a Captain after he showed his military genius and courage in a courageous night assault at a Turkish camp, in an attempt to demoralise the Turkish forces after the catastrophic Battle of Mohács.

Role in History

After becoming the captain of Drégely Castle in 1544, which had a small garrison of only sixty men, six small cannon and twelve castle guns, Szondy was faced with the task of defending it. Drégely Castle was of strategic importance not only to the Hungarians but also to the Turks as a base for raids into Upper Hungary. After hearing that a Turkish force of great numbers was heading towards Drégely, Szondy sent a letter to Erasmus Teuffel, the Captain of the castle in Léva (today Levice, Slovakia), to send reinforcements. Teuffel could only supply him with 146 soldiers.

The Siege of Drégely began on 6 July 1552 when an Ottoman army of 12,000 men led by Hadim Ali Pasha arrived at the gates of Drégely Castle. In that afternoon the first wave of Turkish cannon fire brought down the decayed castle walls and the Janissaries captured the lower castle courtyard without a fight. The next morning the Turks attacked but were defeated by Szondy and his infantrymen, the Hajdús. Despite outnumbering them by 12 to 1, the Janissaries were defeated by Szondy's 100 Hajdús. After acknowledging the bravery of his opponent Ali Pasha decided to launch a full-scale cannonade the next day. The walls were destroyed by noon on 8 July.

On 9 July 1552 Ali Pasha prayed to Allah in the early morning and requested victory. He decided to send the local Catholic priest to Szondy and offer him a choice: either to surrender and be given safe passage and escort to Upper Hungary, or to perish. Szondy sent his scribe and servant with his answer to Ali Pasha saying "Spare the boys and let God settle the fate of this castle". In the afternoon the Janissaries attacked and Szondy ordered the last cannonade to be fired and ordered a full-scale attack against the Turks. Four hours of intensive fighting ensued until Szondy's forces were reduced to sixty men. Szondy led the attack and was shot through the knee and fought even on his knees until he was brought down by the Turks.

One of the Janissaries cut off his head and brought it to Ali Pasha. Ten of Szondy's Hajdús survived and were granted safe passage back to Upper Hungary. Ali Pasha acknowledged Szondy's bravery, and ordered an ornate marble sarcophagus to be made for Szondy and for him to be buried with full military honours.

Legacy
After being given the news of Szondy's demise by the ten remaining Hajdús, the news of his bravery spread beyond Upper Hungary: it became an example also in Poland and even in the farthest corners of the Ottoman Empire.

His name was often used by impostors. Even now, between 6 and 9 July every year Slovaks and Hungarians alike celebrate the life of the great warrior at his sarcophagus in Drégelypalánk, Hungary.

References

External links
 Drégelypalánk's website
 Szondi Tourist Center
 Drégely Castle

16th-century Hungarian people
Hungarian soldiers
1500 births
1552 deaths